is a Japanese ski jumper.

In the World Cup his highest place in an individual event was number 14 from January 2006 in Sapporo.

He participated in the 2006 Winter Olympics held in Pragelato near Turin, where he finished 25th in the large hill and 6th in the team event.

External links

1976 births
Living people
Japanese male ski jumpers
Ski jumpers at the 2006 Winter Olympics
Olympic ski jumpers of Japan
Sportspeople from Aomori Prefecture